Odemira ( or ) is a town and a municipality in Beja District in the Portuguese region of Alentejo. The population in 2011 was 26,066, in an area of 1720.60 km2, making it the largest municipality of Portugal by area.

It is famous for its wild beaches and for being home to a significant Dutch and German community. The village of Zambujeira do Mar is home to the Festival do Sudoeste, one of the biggest rock festivals in Europe.

The municipality of Odemira has great agricultural potential, specially in the western area of the region, and is home to major operations of important agricultural companies like Vitacress, world leader in the salad market.

The present Mayor is José Alberto Guerreiro, elected by the Socialist Party. The municipal holiday is 8 September.

Geography

The municipality of Odemira is located in southwestern Portugal, bordered by the municipalities of Sines and Santiago do Cacém to the north, Ourique to the east, and the Algarvian municipalities of Aljezur and Monchique to the south.

Much of the municipality is within the Southwest Alentejo and Vicentine Coast Nature Park.

Climate
Odemira has a Mediterranean climate. Summers are dry and sunny and are hot in the interior of the municipality (maxima is around  bordering Ourique) and warm at the coast (where maxima is around ).

Parishes
Administratively, the municipality is divided into 13 civil parishes (freguesias):

 Boavista dos Pinheiros
 Colos
 Longueira / Almograve
 Luzianes-Gare
 Relíquias
 Sabóia
 Santa Clara-a-Velha
 São Luís
 São Martinho das Amoreiras
 São Salvador e Santa Maria
 São Teotónio
 Vale de Santiago
 Vila Nova de Milfontes

Notable people 
 Pedro Damiano (1480–1544) a Portuguese chess player and pharmacist by profession
 Pedro de Almada Pereira (1835 in Odemira – 1911) an Alentejan landowner, schoolmaster and journalist, founded the periodical O Campo de Ourique

Population

Gallery

References

External links

Town Hall official website
Photos from Odemira

 
Towns in Portugal
Populated places in Beja District
Municipalities of Beja District